Tarek Mohammed Al-Wazir (born 3 January 1971) is a politician in the German Green Party. Since January 2014 he has been deputy to the Hessian Minister-President, and Hessian Minister of Economics, Energy, Transport and Regional Development. He is a member of the Landtag of Hesse and was co-chair of the Hessian Green Party.

Early life and education 
Al-Wazir was born in Offenbach am Main, Hesse, the son of an upper-class Yemeni father and a Sudeten German mother. He holds dual citizenship of Yemen and Germany. His parents divorced while he was a child, and he spent several years of his youth in the Yemeni capital (Sana'a) with his father, an experience he later described as very influential in his personal development.

After his Abitur in 1991, he studied political science in Frankfurt, where he earned a degree.

Political career 

Al-Wazir joined the German Green Party in 1989, and has been a member ever since. From 1992 to 1994 he was chair of the party's youth organisation (Green Youth) in Hesse. He has been a member of the Landtag since 1995 and is co-chair of the Hessian Green Party (with Kordula Schulz-Asche).

He was the leader of the Greens during the Hesse state election of 2008, and as such was the Green candidate for the position of Minister-President of Hesse. His party gained 7.5% of the votes. In the aftermath of the election, he pushed hard for a "red–green–red" coalition consisting of the Social Democratic Party (SPD), the Greens, and Die Linke. This would have succeeded if not for an internal revolt by SPD members, forcing a new election in January 2009. In the 2009 elections, he again stood as the Green candidate for minister-president. Surveys showed Al-Wazir to be Hesse's most popular politician at the time of the vote. This time his party, also benefitting from popular anger at the SPD, increased its share to 13.7% of the vote, but the Greens remained out of government.

On 18 January 2014, after the 2013 state elections, Al-Wazir became Deputy of the Hessian Minister-President Volker Bouffier and Hessian Minister of Economics, Energy, Transport and Regional Development in a Black-Green coalition. Thus they formed only the third CDU-Green government in Germany's 16 federal states and the first in a big and socially diverse region. As one of Hesse's representatives at the Bundesrat, Al-Wazir is a member of the Committee on Economic Affairs and the Committee on Transport.

Al-Wazir was a Green Party delegate to the Federal Convention for electing the president of Germany in 2017.

In the negotiations to form a so-called traffic light coalition of the Social Democratic Party (SPD), the Green Party and the Free Democratic Party (FDP) following the 2021 German elections, Al-Wazir was part of his party's delegation in the working group on mobility, co-chaired by Anke Rehlinger, Anton Hofreiter and Oliver Luksic.

Other activities (selection)

Regulatory agencies
 Federal Network Agency for Electricity, Gas, Telecommunications, Post and Railway (BNetzA), member of the Advisory Board

Corporate boards
 Helaba, alternate member of the supervisory board
 HA Hessen Agentur GmbH, chair of the supervisory board
 Messe Frankfurt, member of the supervisory board
 Wirtschafts- und Infrastrukturbank Hessen (WIBank), chair of the advisory board

Non-profit organizations
 Hessischer Rundfunk, member of the broadcasting council
 Frankfurt Main Finance, member of the presidium
 Rheingau Musik Festival, Member of the Board of trustees
 Stiftung Schloss Ettersburg, member of the board of trustees

Personal life
Al-Wazir is married to a Yemeni woman, with whom he has two sons. They also split time between Germany and Yemen.

Al-Wazir's surname has been an aptronym since  he assumed ministerial office in 2014, as  "al-wazīr" is Arabic for "the government minister."

References

External links

 Homepage of Tarek Al-Wazir 

1971 births
Alliance 90/The Greens politicians
Living people
German people of Yemeni descent
People from Offenbach am Main
Members of the Landtag of Hesse
Ministers of the Hesse State Government